Two Kinds of Women is a lost 1922 American silent Western film directed by Colin Campbell and starring Pauline Frederick. It is based on the novel Judith of Blue Lake Ranch by Jackson Gregory. Robertson-Cole produced the film and distribution was through Film Booking Offices of America.

Plot
As described in a film magazine, Judith Sanford (Frederick) is the proprietress of the large Blue Lake Ranch that is the subject of a business feud between two rival factions. Judy maintains possession through the loyalty of Old Carson (Pallette) and Bud Lee (Santschi), her foreman, and they thwart the efforts of Bayne Trevor (Clary) and his gang to demoralize the ranch hands to require the selling of the property. Judy holds a dance at the ranch where everyone is expected to be in full dress, and the cowboys use mail order to ensure they are fully equipped for the event. Trevor's gang holds up and robs the paymaster of Judy's ranch, but Bud Lee obtains other money in time so that the men can be paid. He then proceeds to hunt the thief and eventually finds that it is one of Trevor's men. This results in several realistic fistfights.

Cast
 Pauline Frederick as Judith Sanford
 Tom Santschi as Bud Lee
 Charles Clary as Bayne Trevor
 Dave Winter as Pollock Hampton
 Eugene Pallette as Old Carson
 Billy Elmer as Poker face
 Jack Curtis as Chris Quinnion
 Jim Barley as Benny
 Sam Appel as Crowdy
 Clarissa Selwynne as Mrs. Grimley
 Otis Harlan as Major Langworthy
 Jean Calhoun as Marcia Langworthy
 Tom Bates as Jose
 Lydia Yeamans Titus as Mrs Simpson
 Frank Clark as Dr. Tripp
 Bud Sterling as Tommy Burkitt
 Elise Collins as Maid

References

External links

 
 
 Preserved lobby poster (worthpoint.com)

1922 films
Films directed by Colin Campbell
Lost Western (genre) films
1922 Western (genre) films
American black-and-white films
Lost American films
Film Booking Offices of America films
1922 lost films
Silent American Western (genre) films
1920s American films
1920s English-language films